Noah Jacob Bryant (born May 11, 1984, in Santa Barbara, California) is an American shot putter. He attended high school at Carpinteria High School in Carpinteria, CA.  He won the 2002 CIF California State Meet, defeating Adam Tafralis, son of Olympian Gregg Tafralis.

NCAA
He then went on to the University of Southern California where he won both the indoor and outdoor NCAA Championships in 2007. Bryant also competed at the 2007 World Championships in Athletics in Osaka, Japan.  His NCAA history is that much more impressive after Bryant lost most of his sophomore season and needed to go through reconstructive surgery after a freak hammer throw accident when the implement bounced off the protective screen and back into his face.  While at USC, Bryant set the school record in the shot put with a throw of 20.56 meters.

Professional
Bryant finished in fourth place at the USA Outdoor Track and Field Championships in 2007 and 6th in 2009.

References 

American male shot putters
Athletes (track and field) at the 2011 Pan American Games
Living people
1984 births
Track and field athletes from California
University of Southern California alumni
People from Santa Barbara, California
People from Carpinteria, California
Pan American Games track and field athletes for the United States